The Aeros Still is a Ukrainian single-surface ultralight trike wing, designed and produced by Aeros of Kyiv. The wing is widely used on Aeros trikes as well as by other ultralight aircraft manufacturers.

Design and development
The Still wing is a cable-braced, king post-equipped hang glider-style wing designed as a docile beginner and flight training wing for two-place trikes.

The wing is made from bolted-together aluminum tubing, with its single surface wing covered in Dacron sailcloth. The wing's crosstube is exposed and is of a floating design. Its  span wing has a nose angle of 122°, an aspect ratio of 6.1:1 and uses an "A" frame weight-shift control bar.

Applications
Aeros-2
Aeros Cross Country

Specifications (Still-17)

References

External links

Ultralight trike wings